The 2017 Copa Libertadores qualifying stages were played from 23 January to 23 February 2017. A total of 19 teams competed in the qualifying stages to decide four of the 32 places in the group stage of the 2017 Copa Libertadores.

Draw

The draw for the qualifying stages and group stage was held on 21 December 2016, 20:00 PYST (UTC−3), at the CONMEBOL Convention Centre in Luque, Paraguay.

Teams were seeded by their CONMEBOL ranking of the Copa Libertadores (shown in parentheses), taking into account of the following three factors:
Performance in the last 10 years, taking into account Copa Libertadores results in the period 2007–2016
Historical coefficient, taking into account Copa Libertadores results in the period 1960–2006
Local tournament champion, with bonus points awarded to domestic league champions of the last 10 years

For the first stage, the six teams were drawn into three ties (E1–E3), with the seeded teams hosting the second leg.

For the second stage, the 16 teams were drawn into eight ties (C1–C8), with the seeded teams hosting the second leg. Teams from the same association could not be drawn into the same tie, excluding the winners of the first stage, which were unseeded and whose identity was not known at the time of the draw, and could be drawn into the same tie with another team from the same association.

For the third stage, no draw was made, and the eight teams were allocated into the following four ties (G1–G4), with the second stage winners C5–C8 hosting the second leg. As the identity of the winners of the second stage was not known at the time of the draw, they could be drawn into the same tie with another team from the same association.
Second stage winner C1 vs. Second stage winner C8
Second stage winner C2 vs. Second stage winner C7
Second stage winner C3 vs. Second stage winner C6
Second stage winner C4 vs. Second stage winner C5

Format

In the qualifying stages, each tie was played on a home-and-away two-legged basis. If tied on aggregate, the away goals rule would be used. If still tied, extra time would not be played, and the penalty shoot-out would be used to determine the winner (Regulations Article 5.2).

Bracket

The qualifying stages were structured as follows:
First stage (6 teams): The three winners of the first stage advanced to the second stage to join the 13 teams which were given byes to the second stage.
Second stage (16 teams): The eight winners of the second stage advanced to the third stage.
Third stage (8 teams): The four winners of the third stage advanced to the group stage to join the 28 direct entrants. The two best teams eliminated in the third stage entered the Copa Sudamericana second stage.
The bracket was decided based on the first stage draw and second stage draw, which were held on 21 December 2016.

Winner G1

Winner G2

Winner G3

Winner G4

First stage
The first legs were played on 23 January, and the second legs were played on 27 January 2017.

|}

Match E1

Montevideo Wanderers won 7–5 on aggregate and advanced to the second stage (Match C6).

Match E2

Independiente del Valle won 3–2 on aggregate and advanced to the second stage (Match C7).

Match E3

Deportivo Capiatá won 1–0 on aggregate and advanced to the second stage (Match C8).

Second stage
The first legs were played on 31 January and 1–2 February, and the second legs were played on 7–9 February 2017.

|}

Match C1

Tied 1–1 on aggregate, Atlético Paranaense won on penalties and advanced to the third stage (Match G1).

Match C2

Botafogo won 3–2 on aggregate and advanced to the third stage (Match G2).

Match C3

Unión Española won 5–2 on aggregate and advanced to the third stage (Match G3).

Match C4

Junior won 4–0 on aggregate and advanced to the third stage (Match G4).

Match C5

Atlético Tucumán won 3–2 on aggregate and advanced to the third stage (Match G4).

Match C6

The Strongest won 6–0 on aggregate and advanced to the third stage (Match G3).

Match C7

Olimpia won 3–2 on aggregate and advanced to the third stage (Match G2).

Match C8

Deportivo Capiatá won 4–3 on aggregate and advanced to the third stage (Match G1).

Third stage
The first legs were played on 15–16 February, and the second legs were played on 22–23 February 2017.

|}

Match G1

Atlético Paranaense won 4–3 on aggregate and advanced to the group stage (Group 4).

Match G2

Tied 1–1 on aggregate, Botafogo won on penalties and advanced to the group stage (Group 1).

Match G3

The Strongest won 6–1 on aggregate and advanced to the group stage (Group 2).

Match G4

Atlético Tucumán won 3–2 on aggregate and advanced to the group stage (Group 5).

Copa Sudamericana qualification

The two best teams eliminated in the third stage entered the Copa Sudamericana second stage. Only matches in the third stage were considered for the ranking of teams.

Notes

References

External links
 
CONMEBOL Libertadores Bridgestone 2017, CONMEBOL.com 

1
January 2017 sports events in South America
February 2017 sports events in South America